The Hestia tapestry is a Byzantine-era pagan tapestry made in the Diocese of Egypt in the first half of the 6th century. It is now in the Dumbarton Oaks Collection in Washington DC, but generally not on display. 

The Hestia tapestry, which is made of wool, is a late representation of the goddess Hestia. It measures 114 x 136.5 cm (44.9 x 53.7 inches).  It shows the goddess enthroned with two attendants and six putti. The tapestry is identified in Greek as “Hestía Polýolbos" or "Hestia full of Blessings"  and is depicted mainly through the use of pomegranate fruit. Her headdress and earrings are made from pomegranates while the blessings that Hestia gives out are in the form of the fruit. 

The tapestry's history and symbolism are discussed in Friedlander (1945). Scholars note that this pagan artifact is often displayed in Christian households in Egypt.

Bibliography 

 Kitzinger, Ernst. Handbook of the Byzantine Collection. Washington, D.C.: Dumbarton Oaks, 1967
 Friedlander, Paul. Documents of a Dying Paganism: Textiles of Late Antiquity in Washington, New York, and Leningrad. Berkeley, University of California Press, 1945
 Sessa, Kristina. Daily Life in Late Antiquity. Cambridge: Cambridge University Press, 2018
Shrenk, Sabine. "The Background of the Enthroned: Spatial Analysis of the Hanging with Hestia Polyolbos in the Dumbarton Oaks Collection." In Catalogue of the Textile in the Dumbarton Oaks Byzantine Collection, eds. Gudrun Bühl and Elizabeth Dospěl Williams. Washington, D.C.: Dumbarton Oaks, 2019
 Stone, Damien. Pomegranate: A Global History. London: Reaktion Books, 2017

References

External links
 The Hestia Tapestry - Dumbarton Oaks

Hestia
Byzantine art
Tapestries
6th century in Egypt